The 1981 Jack Kramer Open, also known as the Pacific Southwest Open, was a men's tennis tournament played on outdoor hard courts at the Los Angeles Tennis Club in Los Angeles, California in the United States. The event was part of the Grand Prix tennis circuit. It was the 55th edition of the Pacific Southwest tournament and was held from April 13 through April 20, 1981. First-seeded John McEnroe won the singles title and the corresponding $15,000 first-prize money. The finals were delayed to Monday, April 20 due to rain.

Finals

Singles
 John McEnroe defeated  Sandy Mayer 6–7, 6–3, 6–3
 It was McEnroe's 4th singles title of the year and the 28th of his career.

Doubles
 John McEnroe /  Ferdi Taygan defeated  Tom Gullikson /  Butch Walts 6–4, 6–4

References

External links
 ITF tournament edition details

Los Angeles Open (tennis)
Jack Kramer Open
Jack Kramer Open
Jack Kramer Open
Jack Kramer Open